The Flag of Campania is the regional flag of Campania in Italy. It is simply the shield of arms of Campania superimposed on a blue field.

References

Campania
Campania
Flags introduced in 1971